Monasterio de Santa María de Villanueva de Oscos is a monastery in Asturias, Spain. It was founded in the 12th century as a Benedictine house.

The monastic community was closed by the ecclesiastical confiscations of Mendizábal.
The church has remained in use as a parish church.

The cartulary preserves 616 parchments about the Middle Ages: 32 from the 12th century, 261 from the 13th century, 224 from the 14th century and 99 from the 15th century.

References

External links

Monasteries in Asturias
Romanesque architecture in Asturias
Bien de Interés Cultural landmarks in Asturias